This is a list of television programs currently and formerly broadcast by the Canadian television channel DTour and its former incarnation as Prime and TVtropolis.

Current programming
This a list of programs currently being broadcast.

A–E
Airport 24/7: Miami
The Alaska Triangle
America Declassified
Baggage Battles
Best Daym Takeout
Beyond the Unknown
Border Security
Buried Worlds with Don Wildman
Canadian Pickers
The Dead Files
Disaster DIY
Extreme Miami Hotspots
Extreme RVs
Extreme Specials
Extreme Terror Rides: Mega Speed

F–J
Feed the Beast
Fish TV
Food Wars
Ghost Adventures
Great Taste, No Money
Hotel Impossible
Ice Road Truckers

K–O
Lost and Sold
Lost Secrets
Magic Man
Massive Moves
Money Moron
Monumental Mysteries
Murder In Paradise
Museum Secrets
Mysteries at the Museum Specials

P–T
Rust Valley Restorers
Rick and Steve
Ripley's Believe It or Not
Sand Masters
Sturgis Raw
These Woods Are Haunted
Treasures Decoded

U–Z
Ultimate Travel: Killer Beach Houses
World's Weirdest Restaurants
Xtreme Waterparks

Past

A–E
 3rd Rock from the Sun
 A Man Called Shenandoah
 The A-Team
 Ad Persuasion
 Adam-12
 Adventures of Superman
 Alias Smith and Jones
 All in the Family
 The Andy Griffith Show
 Bizarre Foods America
 Automan
 Batman
 Battlestar Galactica
 Baywatch
 The Beverly Hillbillies
 Beverly Hills, 90210
 Bewitched
 The Big Valley
 The Bionic Woman
 Blossom
 The Bob Newhart Show
 Bonanza
 Bosom Buddies
 Boy Meets World
 Branded
 The Brady Bunch
 Brew Dogs
 Bronco
 Burger Land
 Cagney and Lacey
 Cannon
 Car 54, Where Are You?
 Charles in Charge
 Cheers
 Cheyenne
 Coach
 Columbo
 The Cosby Show
 The Cowboys
 Crazy Like a Fox
 Custer
 The Dakotas
 Dallas
 Dark Shadows
 Dawson's Creek
 Dennis the Menace
 Desperate Housewives
 Diagnosis Murder
 The Dick Van Dyke Show
 Diff'rent Strokes
 The Donna Reed Show
 Doogie Howser, M.D.
 The Doris Day Show
 Dragnet
 The Drew Carey Show
 The Dukes of Hazzard
 Eat St.
 Ellen
 Evening Shade
 Everybody Loves Raymond

F–J
 F-Troop
 The Facts of Life
 Falcon Crest
 The Fame
 Family Affair
 Family Guy
 Family Ties
 Fantasy Island
 Father Knows Best
 Frasier
 The Fresh Prince of Bel-Air
 Friday the 13th: The Series
 Friends
 The Fugitive
 Full House
 George Lopez
 Get Smart
 Gilligan's Island
 Gilmore Girls
 Gimme a Break!
 Good Times
 Going Places
 The Golden Girls
 Gomer Pyle, U.S.M.C.
 The Greatest American Hero
 The Green Hornet
 Growing Pains
 The Guns of Will Sonnett
 Gunsmoke
 Happy Days
 Hardcastle and McCormick
 Have Gun, Will Travel
 Hawaii Five-O
 Hazel
 Head of the Class
 Hercules: The Legendary Journeys
 Highlander
 Highway to Heaven
 Hill Street Blues
 Hogan's Heroes
 The Honeymooners
 Hunter
 I Dream of Jeannie
 I Love Lucy
 The Incredible Hulk
 The Invisible Man
 Joanie Loves Chachi

K–O
 Kate and Allie
 The King of Queens
 Kitchen Confidential
 Knight Rider
 Kodiak
 Kolchak: The Night Stalker
 Kung Fu
 Land of the Giants
 Laredo
 Laverne & Shirley
 Leave It To Beaver
 The Legend of Jesse James
 Lois & Clark: The New Adventures of Superman
 The Lone Ranger
 The Loretta Young Show
 Lost in Space
 The Love Boat
 The Lucy Show
 MacGyver
 Mad About You
 Magnum, P.I.
 The Man from U.N.C.L.E.
 Mannix
 The Many Loves of Dobie Gillis
 Marblehead Manor
 Married... with Children
 Martin
 The Mary Tyler Moore Show
 Maverick
 Max Headroom
 M*A*S*H
 McHale's Navy
 Melrose Place
 Miami Vice
 Mission: Impossible
 The Mod Squad
 Moesha
 Moonlighting
 The Monroes
 Mork & Mindy
 Mr. Lucky
 The Munsters
 Murder, She Wrote
 Murphy Brown
 My Three Sons
 The Nanny
 Newhart
 Night Court
 NYPD Blue
 On Our Own
 One Day at a Time
 The Outcasts
 The Outer Limits

P–T
 Paper Moon
 The Partridge Family
 The Patty Duke Show
 Pacific Palisades
 Perfect Strangers
 Perry Mason
 Peter Gunn
 Petrocelli
 Petticoat Junction
 The Phil Silvers Show
 The Phoenix
 Punky Brewster
 Quincy, M.E.
 The Rat Patrol
 Rawhide
 The Real McCoys
 The Rebel
 Remington Steele
 Renegade
 Rhoda
 The Rifleman
 Riptide
 The Rockford Files
 Roseanne
 St. Elsewhere
 Sanford and Son
 Savannah
 Saved by the Bell
 Seinfeld
 7th Heaven
 77 Sunset Strip
 Silver Spoons
 The Six Million Dollar Man
 Sledge Hammer
 Spenser: For Hire
 Spin City
 Stargate SG-1
 Starsky and Hutch
 Star Trek: The Original Series
 Star Trek: The Next Generation
 Stingray
 T.J. Hooker
 Tales of the Gold Monkey
 Tales of Tomorrow
 Taxi
 The Streets of San Francisco
 That '70s Show
 Three's Company
 Time Trax
 Too Close for Comfort
 Touched by an Angel
 Trackdown
 Twelve O'Clock High
 Two and a Half Men
 The Twilight Zone
 21 Jump Street

U–Z
 The Untouchables
 V: The Series
 Voyage to the Bottom of the Sea
 Wagon Train
 Walker, Texas Ranger
 Wanted: Dead or Alive
 Webster
 Welcome Back Kotter
 Werewolf
 White Collar
 Whiz Kids
 Who's the Boss?
 Wings
 Wiseguy
 WKRP in Cincinnati
 Wonder Woman
 The Wonder Years
 The X-Files
 Xena: Warrior Princess
 The Young Lawyers
 Zorro

References

External links
 TVtropolis

Dtour